The rope was an instrument of torture used by the Huguenots in their persecution of Catholics, and involved sawing the human body with a hard-fibered rope.

The victim would be stripped naked, and dragged back and forth across the rope while the fibers cut into the flesh.

References

Modern instruments of torture
European instruments of torture